The Goulet river (in French: rivière Goulet) is a tributary of the Bécancour River. This watercourse flows in the municipalities of Saint-Rosaire and Saint-Louis-de-Blandford, in the Arthabaska Regional County Municipality (MRC), in the administrative region of Centre-du-Québec, in Quebec, in Canada.

Geography 

The main neighboring hydrographic slopes of the Goulet river are:
 north side: Bécancour River, Lacasse stream;
 east side: Desharnais stream;
 south side: Blanche River;
 west side: Bécancour River.

The Goulet River has its source in the 2e  rang of Saint-Louis-de-Blandford.

The Goulet river flows on  according to the following segmentsː
  west and north, in Saint-Rosaire, to the limit of Saint-Louis-de-Blandford;
  westward, to route 165;
  west to highway 20;
  west to its mouth.

The Goulet River empties on the southeast bank of the Bécancour River east of the village of Daveluyville.

Toponymy 

The toponym "rivière Goulet" was made official on December 5, 1968, at the Commission de toponymie du Québec.

See also 

 List of rivers of Quebec

References 

Rivers of Centre-du-Québec
Arthabaska Regional County Municipality